Ko Lamphu (เกาะลำพู) is a river island on the Tapi River in Thailand. It is connected to the mainland by a bridge near the city pillar shrine.

There is a small park on the island, mainly used for picnics and sports. Food stalls are often set up at various spots on the island, serving the visitors with snacks and food. Koh Lamphu offers a view of Surat Thani's skyline with its promenade by the riverfront.

Festivals
The Chak Phra and the Thot Phapa Buddhist ceremonies are celebrated on the same day in October at Ko Lamphu. At the Thot Phapa event Buddha images on elaborately decorated carriages are pulled by local people during land- and water-borne processions. This ceremony takes place at dawn. Chak Phra, celebrated later in the day, consists of offering saffron robes to monks and donations to temples at the end of the Buddhist Rains Retreat.

See also
List of islands of Thailand

References

External links
General information
Use of hydro-bicycle demonstrated at Ko Lamphu

Lamphu
Geography of Surat Thani province
Tourist attractions in Surat Thani province
River islands of Asia